The 2014–15 Azerbaijan First Division  is the second-level of football in Azerbaijan. Araz were the defending champions. The season started on 6 September 2014 and there were sixteen teams participating in the league.

Teams
Araz were promoted to Azerbaijan Premier League, while Ravan Baku relegated to Azerbaijan First Division. In July 2014, it was confirmed that Zira FK will participate in the first division.

Stadia and locations
''Note: Table lists in alphabetical order.

Personnel and kits

Note: Flags indicate national team as has been defined under FIFA eligibility rules. Players may hold more than one non-FIFA nationality.

Managerial changes

League table

Results

Season statistics

Top scorers

Hat-tricks

Poker

Penta-trick

References

External links
 pfl.az
 AFFA 

Azerbaijan First Division seasons
Azerbaijan First Division
2